Vlada Alexeyevna Rumiantseva (born December 28, 2000) is a Russian curler.

She is a student at the Russian State University of Physical Education, Sport, Youth and Tourism in Moscow.

Awards
 Master of Sports of Russia (curling, 2018).

Teams and events

Women's

Mixed

Mixed doubles

References

External links

 Список кандидатов в спортивные сборные команды Российской федерации по кёрлингу на 2019-2020 г.г.
 
 
 
 Video: 

Living people
2000 births
Russian female curlers